Graham Neil Kenneth Mourie  (born 8 September 1952) is a former New Zealand All Black flanker and coach of the Hurricanes. He was one of the great All Black captains in the late 1970s and early 1980s. He was first selected for the All Blacks in 1976, captaining a second-string New Zealand team that toured South America.  He was selected again for the All Blacks against the touring British Lions in 1977, and captained the side to France later that year, replacing Tane Norton as captain.

Early life
Born in Taranaki, he captained his province. He attended Opunake High School and was in the 1st XV before he attended New Plymouth Boys' High School which he also got into the 1st XV but never captained it.

Rugby career
He played a total of 61 matches (57 as captain) for the All Blacks until 1982.  He captained the All Blacks on their historic Grand Slam tour of Britain and Ireland in 1978.  

In 1981, Mourie made himself unavailable for selection during the controversial Springbok Tour of New Zealand. Mourie has said that he has no regrets about his decision not to play against the Springboks in 1981, noting that "You have got to be able to look at yourself in the mirror - look yourself in the eye and say that is the right thing to do." 

He returned as captain later that year for the tour of Romania and France.

He retired from playing in 1982 and together with Ron Palenski penned his autobiography. Because he openly accepted royalties from book sales and declared himself 'professional' - to challenge the existing rules around amateurism, he was banned from coaching, playing or administering the game for 10 years. He returned to coach the Opunake senior team, his club side, after the ban ended.

He was also instrumental in setting up the Coastal rugby club in 1995 and became its first coach.

Coaching 
Mourie's first taste of first-class coaching was with Wellington before he took over from Frank Oliver as head coach of the Hurricanes in 2000. He resigned in June 2002 at the conclusion of the season which was labelled "disappointing" after the team finished 9th.

Recognition 
Mourie was named overall sportsman of the Year in the Taranaki Sports Awards in 1977. In the 1981 Queen's Birthday Honours, Mourie was appointed a Member of the Order of the British Empire, for services to rugby.

He was inducted into the World Rugby Hall of Fame in 2014 and the New Zealand Sports Hall of Fame in 1996. He was inducted into the Taranaki Sports Hall of Fame in 2015.

He was made a Life Member of the Taranaki Rugby Football Union in 2018 and became its Patron in July 2019.

Business career
Mourie worked as a farmer and in farming industry roles.

References

External links 
 

 

1952 births
New Zealand international rugby union players
People educated at Opunake High School
People educated at New Plymouth Boys' High School
World Rugby Hall of Fame inductees
Living people
New Zealand rugby union coaches
New Zealand rugby union players
New Zealand Members of the Order of the British Empire
People from Ōpunake
Rugby union flankers